William VIII (in Occitan: Guilhem; died 1202) was Lord of Montpellier, the son of William VII and Matilda of Burgundy (1135?-1173?).

William VIII married Eudokia Komnene, grand-niece of the Byzantine emperor Manuel I Komnenos.

They had one daughter:
 Marie of Montpellier

Lacking a male heir William separated from Eudokia, sending her to a monastery in Ariane. William married Agnes of Castile and they had:
William IX of Montpellier
Aymard, d.1199
Bergunyo
Bernat William
Tortoseta

The Pope ruled William's marriage to Agnes as illegitimate and Marie was given the throne.

William VIII was a patron of troubadours. Arnaut de Mareuil came to his court after fleeing from the entourage of Azalais of Toulouse, and at least one of Arnaut's poems is addressed to him.

References

12th-century births
1202 deaths
12th-century French people
13th-century French people
Lords of Montpellier
Guilhem dynasty
French patrons of literature
Year of birth unknown